Steve Slagle (born September 18, 1951) is an American jazz saxophonist.

Biography
Slagle was born in Los Angeles and grew up in suburban Philadelphia. He received a scholarship to the Berklee College of Music and received a master's degree in Music From Manhattan School of Music. He came to New York in 1976, first working  with Machito and his Afro-Cuban orchestra, and then toured and recorded  with Ray Barretto, Steve Kuhn, Lionel Hampton, Brother Jack McDuff, and Carla Bley. He also performed and traveled with Woody Herman and Cab Calloway.  In the mid-1980s, he began leading his own combos, first with Mike Stern and Jaco Pastorius, and then with Dave Stryker; the combo is currently the main focus of Slagle's music. He has also played frequently with Joe Lovano and has featured on several of Lovano's albums, including the Grammy-winning 52nd Street Themes.

In the mid-1980s, global and especially Latin influences began to inflect Slagle's work, and he appeared on albums by Milton Nascimento and recorded Rio Highlife in Brazil. He toured frequently worldwide during the 1990s and 2000s, especially in Western Europe, Japan, South America and, latterly, Russia and Bulgaria. During the 1990s, he was a leading figure in the Charles Mingus Big Band. Ever since the late 1990s, Slagle has co-led a band with guitarist Dave Stryker. New New York, his 2000 release, has been seen as an evocation of the city's mood on the verge of 9/11 and an expression of Slagle's love for the city he has made his home. He has played with such diverse artists as Milton Nascimento, St. Vincent, Elvis Costello, the Beastie Boys, and Mac Rebennack (aka Dr. John). Slagle has taught at the Manhattan School of Music, Rutgers, The New School, NYU, and clinics through the Thelonious Monk Institute as well as the Mingus Jazz Workshop and master classes and clinics worldwide.

Slagle's 2008 album The Scene includes a ten-minute ballad, “Hopewell’s Last,” dedicated to the memory of his brother Stuart. Stuart, who died by suicide in 2007,  was a prodigy on guitar who was awarded a full scholarship to the Berklee College of Music.

In 2015, Slagle's duo recording with pianist Bill O'Connell, a tribute album to Kenny Drew Jr. was released as The Power of Two. In  February 2016, Routes (by the Stryker/Slagle Band-Expanded) was released. It was produced by Rick Simpson, with 4-horn arrangements by Steve Slagle. With much critical acclaim, Routes reached #2 on the national radio charts.

Slagle plays and endorses Yanagisawa saxophones — the WO-10 alto saxophone and S9930 soprano saxophone. Steve has also been a long time player of Haynes flutes. On tenor sax, Steve plays a mid-60's Selmer Mark VI, and on baritone sax, a 1947 Silver Conn.

In 2011, Slagle published a composition and improvisation workbook for the creative musician, including stories about his life, in "Scenes, Songs and Solos" (Schaffner Press).

His many original compositions are published with Slagle Music, BMI.

Discography

As leader
 High Standards (Polydor, 1982)
 Rio Highlife (Atlantic, 1986)
 Smoke Signals (Panorama, 1991)
 The Steve Slagle Quartet (SteepleChase, 1993)
 Our Sound! (Double-Time, 1995)
 Reincarnation (SteepleChase, 1995)
 Spread the Word (SteepleChase, 1995)
 Alto Blue (SteepleChase, 1997)
 Steve Slagle Plays Monk (SteepleChase, 1998)
 New New York (OmniTone, 2000)
 Evensong (Panorama, 2013)
 The Power of Two with Bill O'Connell (Panorama, 2015)
 Alto Manhattan (Panorama, 2017)
 Dedication (Panorama, 2018)
 Spirit Calls (Panorama, 2019)
 Alive in Harlem (Panorama, 2020)
 Nascentia, (Panorama, 2021)
 Into The Heart Of It (Panorama, 2022)

With Stryker/Slagle Band
 The Stryker/Slagle Band (Khaeon, 2003)
 Live at the Jazz Standard (Zoho, 2005)
 Latest Outlook (Zoho, 2007)
 The Scene (Zoho, 2008)
 Keeper (Panorama, 2010)
 Routes (Strikezone, 2016)

As sideman
With Carla Bley
 Live! (WATT/ECM, 1982)
 Mortelle Randonnee (Mercury, 1983)
 Heavy Heart (WATT/ECM, 1984)
 I Hate to Sing (WATT/ECM, 1984)
 Live in Montreal (L'Equipe Spectra, 2002)

With Lionel Hampton
 Hamp in Haarlem (Timeless, 1979)
 Live in Europe (Elite Special, 1980)
 Ambassador at Large (Glad-Hamp, 1984)

With Joe Lovano
 52nd Street Themes (Blue Note, 2000)
 On This Day ... Live at The Vanguard (Blue Note, 2003)
 Streams of Expression (Blue Note, 2006)

With Mingus Big Band
 Mingus Big Band 93 Nostalgia in Times Square (Dreyfus, 1993)
 Gunslinging Birds (Dreyfus, 1995)
 Live in Time (Dreyfus, 1996)
 Que Viva Mingus! (Dreyfus, 1997)

With Bill O'Connell
 Rhapsody in Blue (Challenge, 2010)
 Zocalo (Savant, 2013)
 Imagine (Savant, 2014)
 Heart Beat (Savant, 2016)

With Dave Stryker
 First Strike (Someday of Mugen Music, 1990)
 Strike Zone (SteepleChase, 1991)
 Passage (SteepleChase, 1993)
 Full Moon (SteepleChase, 1994)
 Nomad (SteepleChase, 1995)
 Shades of Miles (SteepleChase, 2000)
 Changing Times (SteepleChase, 2001)
 Blue to the Bone III (SteepleChase, 2002)
 Shades Beyond (SteepleChase, 2004)
 Blue to the Bone IV (SteepleChase, 2013)
 Messin' with Mister T (Strikezone, 2015)

With others
 Ray Barretto, Handprints (Concord Picante, 1991)
 Barbara Dennerlein, Outhipped (Universal/Verve, 1999)
 Marianne Faithfull, Strange Weather (Island, 1987)
 Charlie Haden & Carla Bley, The Ballad of the Fallen (ECM, 1983)
 Craig Handy, Reflections in Change (Sirocco Music, 1999)
 High Life, High Life (Elektra Musician, 1986)
 Joe Jackson, Will Power (A&M, 1987)
 Steve Kuhn, Motility (ECM, 1977)
 Steve Kuhn, Non-Fiction (ECM, 1978)
 Mark Soskin, Keys of the City (Koei, 1990)
 Beastie Boys, Hello Nasty (Capitol, 1998)

References

External links
 Steve Slagle homepage
 
 Steve Slagle at Schaffner Press

1952 births
Living people
American jazz saxophonists
American male saxophonists
American jazz flautists
21st-century American saxophonists
21st-century American male musicians
American male jazz musicians
Mingus Big Band members
Double-Time Records artists
SteepleChase Records artists
21st-century flautists